Ras Tanura (presumably due to the unusual heat prevalent at the cape that projects into the sea) is a city in the Eastern Province of Saudi Arabia located on a peninsula extending into the Persian Gulf.  The name Ras Tanura applies both to a gated Saudi Aramco employee compound (also referred to as "Najmah") and to an industrial area further out on the peninsula that serves as  a major oil port and oil operations center for Saudi Aramco, the largest oil company in the world.  Today, the compound has about 3,200 residents, with a few Americans and British expats.

Geographically, the Ras Tanura complex is located south of 
the modern industrial port city of Jubail (formerly a fishing village) and north across Tarut Bay from the old port city of (Al-)Dammam.  Although Ras Tanura's port area is located on a small peninsula, due to modern oil tankers' need for deeper water, Saudi Aramco has built numerous artificial islands for easier docking.  In addition, offshore oil rigs and production facilities have been constructed in the waters nearby, mostly by Saudi Aramco, Schlumberger, and Halliburton.

Demography
Ras Tanura is one of four residential compounds built by ARAMCO in the 1940s and the only one located on the coast of the Persian Gulf itself.  Ras Tanura refinery is surrounded by a heavily guarded security fence, and Saudi employees and their dependents may live inside the Najmah residential compound which is less heavily guarded. Built originally to allow expatriate oil company employees (mainly Americans) a degree of Western comfort and separation from the restrictions of Saudi and Islamic laws, the community today has shifted somewhat in line with the reduction of western residents into a multi-ethnic mosaic of Saudis, other Arab nationalities (e.g. Egyptian and Jordanian), Filipinos, Indians, Pakistanis, and a few Americans and British expats—all of whom live with English as the common language.

Transportation

Highway 
Ras Tanura is connected by a single two-lane highway with the Dhahran–Jubail Highway, which links it with neighboring cities such as Jubail and Dammam as well as with the regional Aramco headquarters in Dhahran.

Airport 
The city is served by King Fahd International Airport.

Although there is a small airport in the city Ras Tanura Airport, it is for the exclusive use of Saudi Aramco, mainly helicopters. However a current project is ongoing to shorten that distance to  if the new road is completed.

References to Ras Tanura in popular culture
A movie-length documentary production of the Saudi Aramco company-built towns, including the Ras Tanura employee camp Najmah, is the nostalgically-titled Home: The Aramco Brats Story, promoted and released with a trailer and DVD in December 2006.

Selection of images

See also
 
 Abqaiq
 Dhahran
 Khobar Towers
 List of cities and towns in Saudi Arabia
 SAR201
 Udhailiyah

External links
 Satellite image showing most parts of Ras Tanura: Aramco residential area, common city, and the huge oilfarms and oil seaport
 City-specific images and documents from the Aramco-Brats.com website
 Aramco Services Company site: By clicking the "communities" link, information and a photo tour can be found about Ras Tanura as well as other Aramco communities.
 A billion barrels ago..., stories in the Ras Tanura refinery
 Ports of Ras Tanura

 
Geography of Saudi Arabia
Populated places in Eastern Province, Saudi Arabia
Populated coastal places in Saudi Arabia
Port cities and towns in Saudi Arabia
Port cities and towns of the Persian Gulf
Saudi Aramco
Gated communities in Saudi Arabia